Alfred Burden (born 14 December 1976) is an English professional snooker player from London.

Career
Burden originally had his eyes set on making a career as a professional footballer, but a badly broken leg curtailed this ambition. He spent a couple of seasons at Arsenal F.C. as a schoolboy apprentice, but was with Swindon Town F.C. at the time of the injury. Burden soon showed he was well above average at snooker and qualified for the World Championship in 1998. He gave Tony Drago a run for his money before losing 8–10.

In the 2006–07 season, Burden qualified for the China Open. He defeated Shokat Ali, Rod Lawler and former top-16 player David Gray to qualify for the tournament but lost in the Wild Card round to Chinese player Mei Xiwen, 2–5. He dropped off the main tour after the 2007/08 season.

On 25 November 2009 he won the IBSF World Snooker Championship in Hyderabad, India, beating Brazilian Igor Figueiredo 10–8 in the final. With this he earned a place on the 2010/2011 professional main tour and did well enough over that and the following season to end 2011/12 ranked world number 60, inside the top 64 who retained their places for the 2012–13 season.

Burden had an exceptional 2012/2013 season in the minor-ranking Players Tour Championship events. In the Second Event he beat Andrew Higginson, James Wattana, Barry Hawkins, Robert Milkins and Ryan Day to reach the semi-finals. There, he was defeated 1–4 by Martin Gould. In the European Tour Event 3 played in Antwerp, Belgium, Burden beat Gareth Allen, Joe Swail and Mark King, before losing 3–4 to Neil Robertson in the last 16. These results, together with three other last 32 defeats, helped Burden to 23rd place on the PTC Order of Merit, just inside the top 26 who qualified for the Finals. In the Finals, Burden beat world number one Judd Trump 4–3, clinching the match with a 116 break to reach the last 16, the joint furthest he has ever been in a ranking event and the first since 2000. Burden subsequently lost 2–4 to Xiao Guodong in the last 16. He then reached the final round of World Championship Qualifying with wins over Paul Davison and Dave Harold, but lost 5–10 to Dominic Dale to end the season ranked world number 53.

Burden qualified for the first round of the 2013 Wuxi Classic to begin the 2013–14 season, but lost 5–2 to Ali Carter in the opening round. He saw off three players to reach the first round of the Australian Goldfields Open and then beat Michael Holt 5–2 to match his best ever performance in a ranking event. In the last 16 he lost 5–3 against Mark Davis. At the European Tour event, the Gdynia Open, Burden won four matches but was then defeated 4–3 by Sam Baird in the quarter-finals. He finished 34th on the Order of Merit, nine places outside of qualifying for the Finals. Burden got through to the second round of the China Open courtesy of Tony Drago's withdrawal and then lost 5–3 to Jimmy White.

Burden won just two matches in his first eight events of the 2014–15 season but then won four matches to advance to the quarter-finals of the Xuzhou Open, where he lost 4–2 to Tom Ford. He beat David Grace 5–3 and Sam Baird 5–4 in qualifying for the German Masters. Burden defeated Michael Georgiou 5–3 in the first round, closing the match with a 112 break, but fell short of reaching the first ranking event quarter-final of his career as Ryan Day knocked him out 5–2. He ended the season 67th in the world rankings which would have relegated him from the tour, but his Asian Tour performances earned him a new two-year card.

Burden reached the first ranking event quarter-final of his career in the 2016 China Open courtesy of victories over Robbie Williams, Joe Perry, Rhys Clark and Rory McLeod, where he lost 5–1 to Stephen Maguire. He held a 9–5 advantage over Ryan Day in the second round of World Championship qualifying, before being defeated 10–9.

Burden edged out Ryan Day 4–3 to qualify for the 2016 European Masters and then beat Yu Delu 4–1 and Ricky Walden 4–3 to play in his second career ranking event quarter-final, where he was thrashed 4–0 by Mark Selby.

Four successive wins saw Burden reach the quarter-finals of the minor ranking 2017 Gibraltar Open, where he lost 4–2 to Michael White.

In December 2016 Burden scored his first 147 Maximum Break in competition, coming against Daniel Wells in the English Open. Burden went on to lose the match 4-3 but came away with £12,000 prize money on account of his high break.

In January 2017, Burden was found guilty of placing bets totalling £25,000 on snooker matches including those he had played in. He had bet on himself to win and over the 86 bets in 10 years he had lost £2,995. Burden was fined £5,000 and given a six-month ban, which will only come into force if he bets on snooker again before January 2018. His second quarter-final of the season came at the Gibraltar Open and he made breaks of 131 and 109 to force a deciding frame with Nigel Bond, but lost it.

Burden went into Qualifying for the 2018 World Championships in danger of losing his place on the Tour and in need of a good showing to retain his place. He achieved this, clinching the deciding frame in the second round of qualifying to beat higher-ranked player David Gilbert 10-9 and secure his place on the Tour for two more years, despite having finished the season outside the top 64, on account of his performances in the 2017/18 season. Burden lost out to Thepchaiya Un-Nooh 10–8 in the final round of qualifying and thus failed to emulate his achievement of 1998 in reaching the last 32 and a place at snooker's biggest stage, the Crucible Theatre.

In December 2018 Burden defeated former world champions Peter Ebdon and John Higgins on his way to reaching the quarter-finals of the Scottish Open. Remarkably, in rounds 2 and 3 he came back from 3-0 down to win 4–3 against Marco Fu and Zhang Yong, respectively. A lacklustre performance in the quarter-final resulted in a 5–0 loss to the eventual tournament winner Mark Allen.

He has the highest number of centuries for any player never to have been ranked in the top 32.

Burden announced his retirement from snooker on 2 September 2020. However, he returned to Q School in May 2021 and was successful in Event Two, winning a two-year Tour Card.

Performance and rankings timeline

Career finals

Non-ranking finals: 2 (1 title)

Amateur finals: 2 (1 title)

References

External links

Alfie Burden at worldsnooker.com

Profile on Global Snooker

1976 births
Living people
Snooker players from London
People from Paddington